XHHT-FM is a radio station in Huamantla, Tlaxcala. Broadcasting on 106.9 FM, XHHT is known as Radio Huamantla and carries a full-service format.

History
XEHT-AM was the first radio station in Tlaxcala, signing on in 1948 on 1520 kHz. It would later move to 810 and increase its power to 5,000 watts before migrating to FM as XHHT-FM 106.9.

References

Radio stations in Tlaxcala
Radio stations established in 1948
1948 establishments in Mexico